Phillips Foods, Inc. and Seafood Restaurants is a family owned and operated seafood company in the mid-Atlantic region, United States. Phillips Foods, Inc., seafood manufacturers as well as restaurateurs, specializes in crab meat and crab cakes, and produces a line of fish and shrimp products. The company is headquartered in Baltimore, Maryland. Phillips Seafood Restaurants have casual dining, buffet service and carryout.

History
In 1914, Augustus E. Phillips established the company's first seafood processing plant on Hooper's Island in Maryland’s Chesapeake Bay. The A.E. Phillips packing plant processed seafood from many of the watermen in the region. In 1956, after a surplus season of crabs, son Brice Phillips and wife Shirley opened the first “crab shack” in Ocean City, Maryland. Brice and Shirley began building a new dining room each year at Phillips Crab House until it finally seated 1400 people.

In 2002, the company was sued for violating the Lanham Act, a statute that provides consumer protection against false advertising. The plaintiff's claimed that Phillips was deceiving its customers after it said that it was following the original recipe while it used Asian crab meat instead of Maryland blue crab.

Phillips Seafood Restaurants currently has 5 company-owned restaurants along the eastern coast of the United States, as well as a network of franchise locations in airports, travel plazas, casinos and sporting arenas.

Crab manufacturing
Phillips is a leading global manufacturer of crab meat, and employs over 2,000 people worldwide. The company's crab processing facilities are found in the United States and Southeast Asia. Ten plants are located worldwide. In 1990, Phillips opened crab processing facilities in Southeast Asia to ensure a year-round supply of swimming crab meat for their restaurants. Phillips Foods has global sales offices in Baltimore, MD and Bangkok, Thailand. While most of the seafood production goes to the United States, the company has a growing market in Asia, Europe, and Australia

Products
Known primarily for their crab cakes, the company has an array of other products available to the retail and foodservice markets, such as crab meat, appetizers, fish, seafood cakes, soups, entrées, spices and sauces. Although the company's reputation was built on its origins as a producer of Maryland blue crab, it now markets primarily crab from Southeast Asia.

See also

List of seafood restaurants

References

1916 establishments in Maryland
American companies established in 1916
Companies based in Baltimore
Hoopers Island
Regional restaurant chains in the United States
Restaurants established in 1916
Restaurants in Maryland
Seafood companies of the United States
Seafood restaurants in the United States
Family-owned companies of the United States
Fish processing companies